Qaleh-ye Now Chaman Zamin (also Romanized as Qal‘eh-ye Now Chaman Zamīn; also known as Qal‘eh Now-e Chaman, Qal‘eh Nau, Qal‘eh Now, and Qal‘eh-ye Now) is a village in Kahrizak Rural District, Kahrizak District, Ray County, Tehran Province, Iran. At the 2006 census, its population was 442, in 106 families.

References 

Populated places in Ray County, Iran